The 1980 Brantford municipal election was held on November 10, 1980, to elect a mayor, councillors, and school trustees in Brantford, Ontario, Canada. Elections were also held in the rural and small-town areas surrounding the city.

Dave Neumann defeated right-wing candidate Andy Woodburn and incumbent Charles Bowen to be elected as mayor.

Results

Charles Ward (died April 14, 1982) was a farmer and union activist. He moved to Canada from England in 1908 to work with Cockshutt Farm Equipment, later worked for Massey-Harris Co., and was the founding president of United Auto Workers Local 458 in Brantford. Ward was first elected to the Brantford City Council in 1952 and served continuously until his death, except for the years 1959-60. He ran unsuccessfully for mayor of Brantford in 1958. In 1963, he was named Brantford Citizen of the Year. A 1980 newspaper article described him as the oldest elected official in Canada. He suffered a stroke in November 1981 that left him unable to fulfill his municipal duties; the Brantford City Council chose not to replace him in honour of his record of service. He died in 1982, at age ninety-one. Charles Ward Park in Brantford is named in his honour.

References

1980 elections in Canada
1980
1980 in Ontario